Parameswaran Iyer (born 16 April 1959) is an Indian civil servant and the former CEO of NITI Aayog. He led the Swachh Bharat Mission, the country-wide sanitation campaign initiated by the Government of India in 2014. He entered the Indian Administrative Service in 1981 and took a voluntary retirement in 2009 to join the water and sanitation initiatives at the World Bank. He served as the Global Lead for Strategic Initiatives in the World Bank's Water Global Practice. In 2016, he returned to India and was appointed by the government to head the drinking and sanitation department, and lead the Swachh Bharat Mission.

Early life
Parameswaran was born in Srinagar to Air Marshal P. V. Iyer (Retd) and Kalyani. He was educated at The Doon School in Dehradun, and at the St. Stephen's College, Delhi. As a student of St. Stephen’s College he represented India at the Junior Davis Cup in Tennis. He then got a one-year exchange scholarship at Davidson College in North Carolina.

Career
Iyer joined the Indian Civil Services in 1981. In 2009, he took a voluntary retirement to become the water resources manager at the World Bank. At the World Bank he worked in China, Vietnam, Egypt, Lebanon and Washington, D.C.. 

In 2016, he joined the Ministry of Drinking Water and Sanitation, Government of India, and was appointed by Prime Minister Modi to spearhead the Swachh Bharat Mission and Sanitation and water Management campaigns related to it. 

He also served as a Professor of Management Practices at Indian Institute of Management (IIM), Ahmedabad.

He has been a columnist with the Indian Express.

Swacch Bharat Mission
In 2016, he was appointed by the Government of India to implement Swachh Bharat Mission, the country-wide sanitation campaign to eliminate open defecation and improve solid waste management. Iyer's modus operandi to achieve the strict goals under the mission (building 110 million toilets in 5 years) was unconventional and "non-bureaucratic"  which increased efficiency and delivery and led to the success of the program.

In 2019, India was declared as Open defecation free on Mahatma Gandhi's 150th birthday Anniversary. India built 100 million toilets in about 0.6 million villages, and another 6.3 million in its cities. A UNICEF study estimated that a household in an ODF village saves an average of up to Rs 50,000 annually on such expenses as treatment of illnesses. The biggest success of the program was to bring behavioural change at grassroot level through awareness campaigns and mass contact programmes.

During his stint at the Ministry of Drinking Water and Sanitation, Iyer had entered a twin-pit toilet to empty it at a Telangana village in 2017 to help residents overcome the taboo of cleaning toilets. Prime Minister Narendra Modi had called the act remarkable during one of his Mann Ki Baat programmes.

The Prime Minister singled him out for praise on another occasion, at a function addressing ‘Swachh Bharat Mission’ volunteers in Bihar’s Champaran in 2018.

Jal Jeevan Mission

He was also given the additional charge of another of the Prime Minister’s pet project, the Jal Jeevan Mission, with the goal of providing piped water supply to all households by 2024 through integrated water supply management at the grassroots.

In 2020, Iyer had resigned from the position and returned to the United States to join the World Bank and be close to his family.

He served as the CEO and Manager of the 2030 Water Resources Group, a public-private-civil society partnership hosted by the World Bank, Washington DC.

In 2022, he returned to Indian Administration as the head of Government of India's apex think tank NITI Aayog.

Bibliography

References

External links
Parmeswaran Iyer - World Economic Forum

Living people
1959 births
World Bank people
The Doon School alumni
St. Stephen's College, Delhi alumni
Davidson College alumni
People from Srinagar
Indian Administrative Service officers